Carl Philipp Leubsdorf (born March 17, 1938) is an American journalist and columnist. He is currently a Washington columnist for The Dallas Morning News, where he was Washington bureau chief from 1981 through 2008.

Biography
Leubsdorf was born in New York City, the son of Bertha (née Boschwitz) and Karl Leubsdorf, both pre-World War II Jewish immigrants from Germany. His father worked for Carl Pforzheimer; his mother was a mathematician who endowed the Karl and Bertha Leubsdorf Gallery at Hunter College in honor of her husband. He is a columnist at The Dallas Morning News and the current secretary of the Gridiron Club and is a past president of both that organization and the White House Correspondents' Association. And it was at the WHCA dinner in April 1997 that Leubsdorf was momentarily roasted, to his delight, by guest speaker Jon Stewart.

After attending the Ethical Culture Fieldston School, he attended Cornell University, where he worked for the Cornell Daily Sun, and held the title of associate editor. He was elected Phi Beta Kappa and graduated with honors in 1959 with a degree in government. He subsequently earned an M.S. with honors in journalism from the Columbia University Graduate School of Journalism. He has worked as a staff writer for the Associated Press (1960–1975) in New Orleans, New York, and Washington; as chief political writer for the AP 1972–75; and as Washington correspondent for The Baltimore Sun 1976–81 prior to his engagement with The Dallas Morning News.

Personal life
Leubsdorf married twice. His first wife was Carolyn (née Cleveland) Stockmeyer, a divorced mother of four children who served as the finance communications director for the Republican National Committee (1982 to 1989) and the Agriculture Department's publications editor during the Bush administration; they had one son, Carl Leubsdorf Jr. In 1982, he married Susan Page, currently Washington Bureau Chief for USA Today, in a non-denominational ceremony in Washington, D.C.

References

External links
 Official Twitter

American male journalists
American people of German-Jewish descent
Journalists from New York City
Jewish American journalists
Cornell University alumni
Columbia University Graduate School of Journalism alumni
Ethical Culture Fieldston School alumni
The Dallas Morning News people
1938 births
Living people
20th-century American journalists